Quibou is a commune in the Manche department in north-western France.

Geography
Quibou is located near to the village of Canisy.

See also
Communes of the Manche department

References

Communes of Manche